Filandari is a comune (municipality) in the Province of Vibo Valentia in the Italian region Calabria, located about  southwest of Catanzaro and about  southwest of Vibo Valentia.

Filandari borders the following municipalities: Cessaniti, Jonadi, Mileto, Rombiolo, San Calogero, Vibo Valentia, Zungri.

Demographic evolution

References

Cities and towns in Calabria